R v Burgess [1991] 2 QB 92 was an appeal in the Court of Appeal of England and Wales that adjudged sleepwalking entailing violence from an internal, organic cause amounts to insane automatism. At first instance he was likewise found not guilty by reason of insanity as his case fell under the M'Naghten Rules. This would entail a possible stigma and a treatment plan. His defence team appealed arguing such automatism was no form of 'insanity' but fell within the class of automatism such as a spiked drink which could show a complete lack of mens rea, outwith the realms of normal mental health, to make him guilty. The court ruled that violent sleepwalking with no external triggers was considered insane automatism. Thus the appeal was heard, argued, the law and its consequences judicially considered. The appeal was dismissed.

Facts
On 2 June 1988 Burgess attacked his friend Miss Katrina Curtis. She had fallen asleep on a sofa and woke up when Burgess, while allegedly sleepwalking, hit her over the head with a bottle. He subsequently picked up a video tape recorder and hit her on the head with it, giving her cuts and bruises. He put his hands around her throat, and when she said, "I love you Bar," it appeared that he came to his senses, and he called for an ambulance.

Judgement
On 20 July 1989 the Crown Court found Burgess not guilty by reason of insanity on a charge of wounding with intent. He was ordered to be detained at a psychiatric hospital. Under section 12 of the Criminal Appeal Act 1968, Burgess appealed the decision.

Appeal
The defendant brought in psychiatrist Dr. d’Orban and neuropsychiatrist Dr. Eames for medical evidence. The prosecution called in neuropsychiatrist Dr. Fenwick who contended that the incident was not run-of-the-mill sleepwalking, but perhaps a hysterical dissociative state.

The judge, Lord Lane said, "We accept of course that sleep is a normal condition, but the evidence in the instant case indicates that sleep walking, and particularly violence in sleep, is not normal."

It was found that the violent action was due to an internal, organic cause, rather than an external one. Thus, the appeal was dismissed.

Implications
The sleepwalking in this case was violent and had a possibility of recurrence, so it could be considered a form of insanity.

References

B
Court of Appeal (England and Wales) cases
1991 in case law
1991 in British law